A Tiene was a special container for transporting wine and fruit, used until shortly after the First World War in northern Germany.

Tiene may also refer to:

Izalene Tiene (born 1943), Brazilian social worker and politician
Siaka Tiéné (born 1982), Ivorian footballer
Carla Tiene (born 1981), former Brazilian professional tennis player
Schwenck (born 1979), short for Cléber Schwenck Tiene, Brazilian football player
Tiene language, a Bantu language of the Democratic Republic of Congo
Tiene (Radegast), a river of Mecklenburg-Vorpommern, Germany, tributary of the Radegast